The Assata Shakur Community Library is a library in São Paulo, Brazil. It was started by the Ujima Organization to help educate black Brazilians, promote black culture, and spread the work of black writers. The library opened in 2019 in the neighborhood of Vila Formosa. It is named after Assata Shakur, who used to be in the Black Liberation Army and the Black Panthers. The library also distributed food and supplies during the COVID-19 pandemic.

References 

Libraries in São Paulo
2019 establishments in Brazil
Libraries established in 2019
Shakur family